Bijou Kisombe Mundaba (born September 29, 1976) is a Congolese football player who last played for AS Vita Club.

He was part of the Congolese team for the 1998 African Nations Cup, 2002 African Nations Cup and 2004 African Nations Cups.

References

1976 births
Living people
Democratic Republic of the Congo footballers
Democratic Republic of the Congo international footballers
1998 African Cup of Nations players
2002 African Cup of Nations players
2004 African Cup of Nations players
AC Sodigraf players
AS Dragons players
G.D. Interclube players
AS Vita Club players
Association football defenders
Democratic Republic of the Congo expatriate footballers
Expatriate footballers in Angola
Democratic Republic of the Congo expatriate sportspeople in Angola
21st-century Democratic Republic of the Congo people